En Sol Mayor (In G Major) is the nineteenth studio album by Colombian musician singer-songwriter Joe Arroyo, released by Sony Music Colombia on December 3, 1999. Is one of the last albums with the sign "Sony Music", the album contains tropical mixes that shared with folk rhythms. The single "Sabré Olvidar" had a successful in Colombia, being a cover of the American salsa band, "The TnT Band".

Track listing

Credits and personnel 
Credits for En Sol Mayor adapted from Allmusic and liner notes.

Musicians

 Joe Arroyo – composer, vocals
 Juan Carlos Acosta – background vocals
 Maurico Daltaire – background vocals
 Luis Moyano – background vocals
 Juan Piña – background vocals
 Emiliano Zuleta – accordion
 Armando Castro – caja

 Carlos Piña – background vocals, saxophone
 Roberto Meza – keyboards
 Ramón Benítez – drums, trombone
 Alfonso Puello – guache, percussion, tambor alegre, tambora, telephone voice
 Carlos Huertas – guitar
 Jorge Bermúdez – saxophone tenor

Production
 Iván Cardenas – engineer, mixing
 Daniel Lopéz – engineer, mixing
 Humberto Chaparro – engineer
 Rolando Altamar – composer
 Pablo Cairo – composer
 Tito Ramos – composer

References 

Joe Arroyo albums
Sony Music Colombia albums
1999 albums